The 2023 Toronto Argonauts season is scheduled to be the 65th season for the team in the Canadian Football League and their 150th year of existence. The Argonauts will enter the season as defending champions following their victory in the 109th Grey Cup. The team will attempt to return to the playoffs for a third consecutive season and win their league-leading 19th Grey Cup championship.

The 2023 CFL season is scheduled to be the third season for head coach Ryan Dinwiddie and the fourth season for Michael Clemons as general manager. The team will hold their training camp at the University of Guelph for the second consecutive season.

Offseason

CFL Global Draft
The 2023 CFL Global Draft is scheduled to take place on May 2, 2023. If the same format as the 2022 CFL Global Draft is used, the Argonauts will have three selections in the draft with the ninth-best odds to win the weighted draft lottery.

CFL National Draft
The 2023 CFL Draft is scheduled to take place on May 2, 2023. The Argonauts currently have eight selections in the eight-round draft after acquiring an additional sixth round pick from the Edmonton Elks after trading Jalen Collins and Martez Ivey, but trading their first-round pick to the BC Lions for Jordan Williams. The team is scheduled to have the ninth selection in each of the eight rounds of the draft (not including forfeited picks by other teams or traded picks) after winning the 109th Grey Cup.

Preseason
The Argonauts' home preseason game will be played at Alumni Stadium in Guelph, Ontario.

Schedule

Regular season

Standings

Schedule
The Argonauts will be the home team for a neutral site game in Halifax for the Week 8 match-up with the Saskatchewan Roughriders. This will be the second consecutive year that the two teams meet in Nova Scotia and the first repeat matchup in the Touchdown Atlantic series.

Team

Roster

Coaching staff

References

External links
 

Toronto Argonauts seasons
2023 Canadian Football League season by team
2023 in Ontario